Nucleosome Positioning Region Database (NPRD) is a database of nucleosome formation sites (NFSs).

See also

References

External links
 http://srs6.bionet.nsc.ru/srs6/.

Biological databases
Genetics databases